The De Morbis Artificum Diatriba (Dissertation on Workers' Diseases) is the first book written specifically about occupational diseases and work-related risk prevention. It was written in Latin by Bernardino Ramazzini and published in Modena in 1700. In 1713 the second edition was printed in Padua. Since a long time, Ramazzini is the acknowledged father of occupational medicine (Pagel JL. Über Bernardino Ramazzini und seine Bedeutung in der Geschichte der Gewerbehygiene. Dtsch Med Wschr 1891;17:224-6; Garrison FH. Founder and father of industrial medicine. Bull NY Acad Med 1934;12:679-94). The Diatriba has been cited by Adam Smith, Karl Marx, and Cotton Mather, and is considered a seminal work in the field of occupational medicine and occupational health. It describes between 53 and 69 different professions, and includes analytical and methodological approaches to diagnose and prevent diseases associated with them. It was the first book to consider substance exposure as a cause of headaches.

References

1700 books
Italian non-fiction books
Books about diseases
Occupational diseases
17th-century Latin books